VEB Kombinat Robotron (or simply Robotron) was the largest East German electronics manufacturer. It was headquartered in Dresden and employed 68,000 people in 1989. Its products included personal computers, SM EVM minicomputers, the ESER mainframe computers, various computer peripherals as well as microcomputers, radios, television sets and other items including cookie press Kleingebäckpresse Typ 102.

Divisions
Robotron managed several different divisions:
VEB Robotron-Elektronik Dresden (headquarters) — typewriters, personal computers, minicomputers, mainframes
VEB Robotron-Meßelektronik Dresden — measurement and testing devices, home computers
VEB Robotron-Projekt Dresden — software department
VEB Robotron-Buchungsmaschinenwerk Karl-Marx-Stadt — personal computers, floppy disk drives
VEB Robotron-Elektronik Hoyerswerda — monitors, power supply units
VEB Robotron-Elektronik Radeberg — mainframes, radio receivers, portable television receivers, directional radio systems
VEB Robotron Vertrieb Dresden, Berlin and Erfurt — sales departments
VEB Robotron-Elektronik Zella-Mehlis — computer terminals, hard disk drives
VEB Robotron-Büromaschinenwerk Sömmerda — personal computers, printers, electronic calculators (Soemtron 220, 222, 224), invoicing machines (EFA 380), punched card indexers and sorters (Soemtron 432).
VEB Robotron Elektronik Riesa — printed circuit boards
VEB Robotron-Anlagenbau Leipzig — general contractor, design and assembly for computer and process calculation systems in the GDR and export, training center

On 30 June 1990, Kombinat Robotron was liquidated and its divisions were converted into corporations. In the 1990s, these companies were sold, e.g. to Siemens Nixdorf and IBM, or liquidated. Less than five percent of the employees were able to switch to successor companies. However, the abundance of highly qualified workers promoted the subsequent settlement of various companies in the region.

Robotron Datenbank-Software GmbH is a company which emerged from one of the former divisions of Kombinat Robotron. It was newly founded on 23 August 1990, just before German reunification.

Robotron hardware and software
Robotron product series include:
 Midrange computer EDVA  (based on IBM 1401),
 R 4000 and R 4200 computers (based on Honeywell Series 16),
 ES EVM systems , EC 1055, EC 1056, EC 1057 (based on  IBM System/360, IBM System/370),
 Minicomputer and Superminicomputer  (DEC PDP-11), K 1840 (VAX 11/780), K 1820 (MicroVAX II),
 Office and personal computers A 5120, PC 1715,  (IBM XT),  (IBM AT),
 OEM modular microcomputer systems K 1510, K 1700
 Operating systems such as Single User Control Program (based on CP/M), Disk Control Program [de] (based on MS-DOS) and

Rebranding of products
Robotron printers were sold in Western Germany as Soemtron or Präsident, and the West German branch of Commodore used some Robotron parts for their printers.

In East Germany, Epson printers were sold under the Robotron brand that still had the Epson logo on the back.

K 1520 bus standard
The K 1520 bus was an early computer bus, created by VEB Robotron in 1980 and specified in TGL 37271/01. It was the predominant computer bus architecture of microcomputer-sized systems of East Germany, whose industry relied heavily on the U880 microprocessor, a clone of the Zilog Z80.

Among the large number of boards developed using the standard were CPU modules, RAM modules, graphics cards, magnetic tape controllers and floppy disk controllers.

It was originally intended to be used to connect boards to backplanes, as in the  modular microcomputer system,  A 5120 office computer, A 5130 office computer and the Poly-Play arcade cabinet.

But it was also used as an expansion bus for computers that featured a mainboard such as 
 PC 1715 office computer - with 2 internal slots, one being occupied by the floppy disk controller
 KC 85/2, KC 85/3, KC 85/4 microcomputers - with two internal slots for expansion cartridges and one back-side connector for:
 D002 - expansion unit for 4 additional expansion cartridges
 D004 - a floppy controller subsystem plus 2 cartridge slots
 KC 87 microcomputer - a.k.a. Z 9001 and KC 85/1
 Z 1013, a home computer - consumer product in kit form
 BIC A 5105 [de] educational microcomputer - not produced in significant quantities
 KC compact late home computer - not produced in meaningful quantities

The bus had 58 pins and was commonly physically represented by a two-row connector with 29 pins each. The following signals and connections were used:
 DB0 ... DB7 (bidirectional data bus)
 AB0 ... AB15 (address bus)
 /MREQ, /IORQ, /RD, /WR, /RFSH, /M1, /WAIT, /HALT, /INT, /NMI, /BUSRQ, /RESET (Z80 control signals)
 /BAI, /BOA (/BUSACK priority chain)
 /IEI, IEO (interrupt enable priority chain)
 /IODI, /MEMDI, /RDY
 clock, +5V, -5V, +12V, ground

See also
 Rolanet - East German networking standard
 VEB Kombinat Mikroelektronik Erfurt - East German manufacturer of active electronic components
 Electronics industry in East Germany
 Economy of East Germany
 History of computer hardware in Eastern Bloc countries

References

External links

Robotron.foerderverein-tsd.de — The History of Robotron narrated by former staff members. German language site.
Computer-archiv.de — On-line generalised list of computers including Robotron. German language site.
Robotrontechnik.de — On-line museum of Robotron companies and products. German language site with some English translations.
Soemtron.org — Technical data for the Soemtron 22x series (220, 222, 224) desktop calculators manufactured by VEB Robotron Büromaschinenwerk Sömmerda.
Typewriter "Erika" — DDR Museum, Berlin
Company History — Company History Robotron Radeberg.

Home computer hardware companies
Volkseigene Betriebe
Defunct companies of Germany
Science and technology in East Germany